The chestnut-shouldered goshawk (Erythrotriorchis buergersi) is a species of bird of prey in the family Accipitridae. It is found in New Guinea.

References

chestnut-shouldered goshawk
Birds of prey of New Guinea
chestnut-shouldered goshawk
Taxonomy articles created by Polbot